Cop or Cops commonly refers to:
 Police officer

Cop and other variants may also refer to:

Art and entertainment

Film
 Cop (film), a 1988 American thriller
 Cops (film), an American silent comedy short starring Buster Keaton
 The Cop (1928 film), an American silent drama
 The Cop (1970 film), an Italian crime film
 Un flic, alternatively entitled The Cop, a 1972 French crime film

Music
 COP International, a record label
 The Cops (Australian band), an Australian rock band
 Cop (album), by Swans
 "Cop", a song by Alkaline Trio on the album Goddamnit
Cops (EP), a song by the Australian band The Cops
  "The Cop", a song by The Knife on the album Deep Cuts

Television
 Cop (TV series), a 2019 Russian crime comedy-drama TV series
 Cops (TV program), an American docuseries television program
 COPS (animated TV series), a 1988–1989 American animated series
 The Cops (British TV series), a 1998–2001 British crime drama
 The Cops (Israeli TV series), a 2021 crime drama

Other uses in art and entertainment
 C.O.P.S 'N' Crooks, a line of action figures
 C.O.P. The Recruit, a 2009 video game

Brands and enterprises
 COP International, a record label
 Columbus Outdoor Pursuits, parent organization of the Great Ohio Bicycle Adventure
 ConocoPhillips, an energy company, NYSE symbol COP
 COP Inc., manufacturer of the COP .357 Derringer pistol
 Copper State Air Service, an airline, ICAO designator COP

Computing
 COP, an interrupt in 65xx processors
 COPS (software), a UNIX security tool
 C Object Processor, a superset of the C programming language
 Common Open Policy Service, a network management protocol
 Common operational picture, a type of military technology
 Computer Operating Properly, a type of embedded timer
 COP8 and COP400, Control-Orientated Processor System. Simple microcontroller chips. Now superseded by PICs.

Healthcare
 Community ophthalmic physician, a type of medical ophthalmologist in the Republic of Ireland
 Cryptogenic organizing pneumonia, an illness
 Cyclophosphamide, Oncovin, and Prednisone/Prednisolone, a variant of the chemotherapy regimen CHOP

Organizations and conferences
 Cathedral of Praise, a Pentecostal church in Ermita, Manila, Philippines
 College of Paramedics, a  professional representative body in the UK
 Comité Olímpico de Portugal, the Olympic Committee of Portugal
 Comité politique et de sécurité, French name for the Political and Security Committee of the European Union
 Communities Organized for Public Service, a Texas community organization
 Community Oriented Policing Services, an agency of the U.S. Department of Justice
 Conference of the parties, the supreme governing body of an international convention
 United Nations Climate Change Conference, yearly conferences of the COP (commonly referred to as COP followed by the edition number) 
 Congress of the People (Trinidad and Tobago), a political party

Places
 Cop, Saint-Louis-du-Sud, Haiti, a town in the Aquin Arrondissement of Haiti
 Centralny Okreg Przemyslowy,  Polish industrial region
 Canada Olympic Park, in Calgary, Alberta, Canada

Science

 Center of pressure (terrestrial locomotion), characteristic point in locomotion dynamics
 Coat protein; see COPI
 Coefficient of performance, a concept in thermodynamics
 Community of practice, a group of people who share a craft or a profession
 Opposite category (Cop), a concept in category theory

Other uses 
 Čop (surname)
 Cop, the ball which builds up on the spindle in spinning
 Code of Points, another name for the ISU Judging System used to score ice skating
 Community-oriented policing, a policing strategy
 Colombian peso, a currency, by ISO 4217 code
Combat outpost (military)
 Coptic language, ISO 639-2 code cop
 Cost of products sold,  concept in economics
 Close of play, alternative term for the end of day
 Short for coprophagia

See also
 
 Copper (disambiguation)
 Copse, a small area of woodland